Schifano is an Italian surname. Notable people with the surname include:

Andréa Schifano (born 1991) Belgian footballer
Helen Schifano (1922–2007), American gymnast
Mario Schifano (1934–1998), Italian painter and collagist

Italian-language surnames